Rapid Metro Gurgaon is a light metro system serving the city of Gurgaon, Haryana, India. Rapid Metro connects the commercial areas of Gurgaon, and acts as a feeder link to the Delhi Metro with an interchange with its Yellow Line at Sikanderpur metro station.

Built by Rapid Metro Gurgaon Limited (RMGL), the system was the world's first fully privately financed modern light metro system. The venture did not have any investment from the Union Government, Government of Haryana or any public sector undertaking. However, it was not the first fully privately financed rapid transit system, as the Metropolitan Railway was privately financed. Originally planned to open in 2012, the first phase of the system opened on 14 November 2013. The second phase of the project began commercial operation on 31 March 2017. In September 2019, IL&FS announced that it does not have the resources to continue running the Rapid Metro due to financial issues with the company and is looking for another entity to fund and takeover operations. After a short dispute with the Haryana government and a court ruling from the Punjab and Haryana High Court, the Delhi Metro Rail Corporation took over the operation of the line from IL&FS.

Rapid Metro has a total length of  serving 11 stations. The system is fully elevated using standard-gauge tracks. The trains are composed of three cars. The power is supplied by 750 volt direct current through third rail. Services operate daily between 06:05 and 22:00 running with a headway of four minutes. The metro system was the first in India to auction naming rights for its stations.

History
A  metro line between Sikanderpur and National Highway 8 was originally proposed in September 2007. The Haryana Urban Development Authority (HUDA) invited expressions of interest to construct the metro line on built-operate-transfer basis with a 99-year lease in 2008. However, real estate developer DLF wanted to provide metro connectivity to its Cyber City. A new tender was issued in July 2008, with the DLF-IL&FS consortium emerging as the only bidder. The project was initially conceived as a collaborative venture between Enso Group, DLF and Infrastructure Leasing & Financial Services (IL&FS). Rapid Metro is the first fully privately financed modern metro system in the world. Rapid Metro did not even get the 20 acres of land, which it required to construct the first phase of the project, at any concessional rate from the state.

The Rapid Metro project was implemented as a public-private partnership. The entire cost of the project was borne by the private party. The private party was also tasked with maintenance and operation of the metro at its own cost. While HUDA initially objected to a private company making profit from public transport, an agreement was eventually reached for the consortium to pay HUDA  over 35 years in "connectivity charges" as well as 5–10% of advertising and property development revenue.

The contract for the  project was awarded in July 2009, with completion scheduled in 30 months' time. The foundation stone was laid on 11 August 2009. The line was built and is operated by Rapid Metro Gurgaon Limited (RMGL). The project was estimated to cost  as of October 2012.

Originally planned to open in 2012, the first phase of the system opened on 14 November 2013.

Phase II
On 11 June 2013, IL&FS Engineering and Construction Company Limited informed the Bombay Stock Exchange that it had been awarded a contract worth  266.5 crores to construct the elevated viaducts for Phase 2 of the project. The company also stated that the project would be completed within 24 months. The company was later awarded a contract worth  84.3 crore to construct all 5 elevated stations in Phase II. The project completion period was specified as 24 months. It is estimated to cost . There are six stations on the extension and it will take around 20 minutes to travel the entire route. Land for the project and right of way will be provided by HUDA. Trial runs were held on the first phase of the metro, between Phase 2 and Phase 3 stations, in October 2012. On the same day, Chief Minister Bhupinder Singh laid the foundation stone for Phase 2 of the project.

Construction work on Phase 2 began in April 2013, and was given an initial deadline of July 2015. However, the deadline was later revised to mid-2016, September 2016 and then the last quarter of 2016. By June 2016, 75% of work on the Phase 2 was complete. Trial runs were conducted along the 6.3-km Phase-2 route between in December 2016. Rapid Metro authorities applied for inspection of phase II by the Commissioner of Metro Rail Safety in March 2017. The second phase of the system was opened to the public on 31 March 2017.

Route

Line 1
Line 1 was built in two phases. The section between Sikanderpur and Phase 2 station is double-tracked, while the remaining stations are served by a single-track loop. This section of a line opened on 31 March 2017 partially till Sector 53–54. The two remaining stations till Sector 55-56 opened on 25 April 2017. Platforms are 75m in length.

Sikanderpur station offers an interchange with Delhi Metro via a 90m x 9m walkway.

Infrastructure 
The system is fully elevated and operated automatically. Because of the features, several articles in railway magazines define the system as Light Metro.

Rolling stock 
On 21 April 2010, Siemens announced that it had been awarded a turnkey contract to build the metro line, including five three-car metro trains. Siemens sub-contracted CRRC Zhuzhou Locomotive to build the 5 aluminium-bodied air-conditioned trains. The first three-coach train set built in China, arrived in Gurgaon on 11 September 2012. RMGL ordered an additional seven three-car metro train sets for the second phase expansion of the metro. The final 4 of these 7 rakes arrived in Gurgaon on 5 February 2016.

Each train with three coaches costs  and is silver and blue in colour. Each train has a capacity of approximately 800 passengers. The metro is designed to carry 30,000 passengers per hour.

Operations

Operator
The line was built and is operated by Rapid Metro Gurgaon Limited (RMGL), founded as a joint venture between Enso group, real estate developer DLF and IL&FS. DLF owns many properties near the stations, while IL&FS was the majority stake holder in the JV. DLF later sold its stake to IL&FS, and exited the joint venture. Following the transaction, IL&FS Transportation Networks Ltd (ITNL) held 82.8% stake in RMGL, and ITNL's subsidiary IL&FS Rail Ltd (IRL) held 17.2%.

Delhi Metro tokens and smart cards are accepted on Rapid Metro. The automatic fare collection system is supplied by Thales Group.

Ridership
Ridership of the Rapid Metro has been below expectations.  Phase 1 was expected to bring 100,000 riders per day, but only achieved 30,000, and even after the addition of Phase 2, daily ridership in 2018 hovered around the 50,000 mark.  Urban Transport News has described the Rapid Metro as a "failure" due to its high cost, low ridership and poor location.

Frequency
Trains run from 06:05 to 22:00 Three-coach trains operate at four-minute intervals.

Safety
For the passengers' safety, there are Emergency Stop Plungers at every platform, while the Blue Light Station feature enables passengers to contact the Control Room. A Press to Talk Button inside the coaches enables commuters to talk directly to the driver, in the event of any problem.

Security
Security in the Rapid Metro is being handled by a private security agency. The system has a dedicated Metro Police Station at Sikanderpur station, while a Toll Free Helpline for all passengers is operational for 24 hours. CCTV cameras are used to monitor trains and stations.

Future plans

Phase III
Following the opening of Phase II, IL&FS Rail Ltd managing director and CEO Rajiv Banga stated that plans for the third phase of the metro were at the "drawing board-level". Banga stated that authorities were considering a 17-km-long line from Cyber City to Gurgaon Railway Station via Bus stand and Sadar Bazar in Old City passing through Udyog Vihar along Old Delhi Road And Railway Road. This extension will be a big relief for Old Gurgaon people because this line will have a numerous and future interchange station like Dwarka-Iffco Chowk Metro interchange at Old Delhi Road near Maruti Suzuki and another at Gurgaon Railway Station with yellow line extension of Huda City Centre to Sector 23 Palam Vihar (having interchange with Dwarka-Iffco Chowk Metro) via Hero Honda Chowk, Sector 10 and Gurgaon Railway Station And one more interchange at Sector 4-7 Chowk with pod taxi running between Rajiv Chowk (Gurgaon) Badshahpur pod taxi (Dhaula Kuan to Manesar pod taxi master plan) up to Sector 4-7 Chowk

See also
 Urban rail transit in India
 Delhi Metro
 Noida Metro

References

External links

 Official website of Rapid Metro Gurgaon Limited (RMGL)
See Metro Map data of Indian Metro

 
Standard gauge railways in India
2013 establishments in Haryana